Rudolf Körner (8 January 1892, Leipzig – 13 November 1978, Füssen) was a German gymnast who competed in the 1912 Summer Olympics. In 1912 Körner was a member of the German team which finished fourth in the team, free system competition and fifth in the team, European system event.

He studied in Leipzig Biology, Chemie, Geologie, History and Sport to become a Teacher. He was member of the Frankfurt-Leipziger Burschenschaft Arminia. In both world wars he fought as an Officer and was appreciated with high medals of honour.

References

1892 births
1978 deaths
German male artistic gymnasts
Olympic gymnasts of Germany
Gymnasts at the 1912 Summer Olympics
Sportspeople from Leipzig